Latino sine flexione ("Latin without inflections"), Interlingua de Academia pro Interlingua (IL de ApI) or Peano's Interlingua (abbreviated as IL), is an international auxiliary language compiled by the Academia pro Interlingua under chairmanship of the Italian mathematician Giuseppe Peano (1858–1932) from 1887 until 1914. It is a simplified version of Latin, and retains its vocabulary. Interlingua-IL was published in the journal Revue de Mathématiques in an article of 1903 entitled De Latino Sine Flexione, Lingua Auxiliare Internationale (meaning On Latin Without Inflection, International Auxiliary Language), which explained the reason for its creation. The article argued that other auxiliary languages were unnecessary, since Latin was already established as the world's international language. The article was written in classical Latin, but it gradually dropped its inflections until there were none.

Language codes ISO 639: ISO 639-2 and -1 were requested on 23 July 2017 at Library of Congress (proposed: IL and ILA); ISO-639-3 was requested on 10 August 2017 at SIL (proposed: ILA) and was rejected on 23 January 2018.

History 

In 1903, Peano published the article De Latino Sine Flexione to introduce his language. In this work, Peano quoted a series of suggestions by Leibniz about a simplified form of Latin. The article appeared to be a serious development of the idea, and Peano subsequently gained a reputation among the auxiliary language movement.

In 1904, Peano undertook an essay about the way to obtain the minimal grammar of an eventual minimal Latin (Latino minimo), with a minimal vocabulary purely international.

Peano and some colleagues published articles in Latino sine flexione for several years at the Revue de Mathématiques.  Because of his desire to prove that this was indeed an international language, Peano boldly published the final edition of his famous Formulario mathematico in Latino sine flexione. However, as Hubert Kennedy notes, most mathematicians were put off by the artificial appearance of the language, and made no attempt to read it.

In October 1907, Peano was at the Collège de France in Paris to take part in the Delegation for the Adoption of an International Auxiliary Language. Having declared for Latino sine flexione to be adopted, he eventually could not participate in the final voting, because of labour affairs at Turin.

On 26 December 1908, Peano was elected member and director of the Akademi internasional de lingu universal still using Idiom Neutral, which was refounded one year later under the name Academia pro Interlingua. Every academician might use their favourite form of Interlingua, the term being initially used in a general sense as a synonym for international language, yet it soon began to be specially used to denote a reformed Latino sine flexione based on the common rules the academicians were reaching by frequent votings. Thus, the name Interlingua soon began to denote the language evolving from the Academia Pro Interlingua, with the corresponding abbreviation IL.

However, every member was free to write in their own personal style, and indeed some members were proposing radical reforms which eventually might end up as independent languages (like Michaux's Romanal or De Wahl's Interlingue). For this reason, the name Peano's Interlingua or Interlingua (IL) might be regarded as the most accurate for the particular standard by Peano. (As found in "Interglossa and its predecessors".)

The discussions to reach a standard Interlingua may be seen on the pages of Discussiones, the official journal of the Academia pro Interlingua from 1909 to 1913. This and subsequent journals of the academy have been recently published in a CD-Rom by the mathematics department of the university of Turin, the place where Peano developed his teaching and research.

Since De Latino Sine Flexione had set the principle to take Latin nouns either in the ablative or nominative form (nomen was preferred to nomine), in 1909 Peano published a vocabulary in order to assist in selecting the proper form of every noun, yet an essential value of Peano's Interlingua was that the lexicon might be found straightforward in any Latin dictionary (by getting the thematic vowel of the stem from the genitive ending, that is: -a -o -e -u -e from -ae -i -is -us -ei).
Finally, a large vocabulary with 14 000 words was published in 1915.

A reformed Interlingua was presented in 1951 by Alexander Gode as the last director of the International Auxiliary Language Association. It was claimed to be independent from Peano's Interlingua, because it had developed a new method to detect the most recent common prototypes. But that method usually leads to the Latin ablative, so most vocabulary of Peano's Interlingua would be kept. Accordingly, the very name Interlingua was kept, yet a distinct abbreviation was adopted: IA instead of IL.

Alphabet and pronunciation 

According to Peano's guide to the language in 1931, "most Interlinguists are in favour of the old Latin pronunciation." This gives the pronunciation of vowels as follows:

 a—as in father: 
 e—as in they: 
 i—as in feet: 
 o—as in tone: 
 u—as in rule: 
 y—as French u: 
 j—as in yes: 
 ae—as in eye: 
 oe—as in boy: 

Consonants are pronounced largely as in English, with the following clarifications:

 b—like English b, but like p if followed by s or t: 
 g—like g in go, get: 
 h—silent in rh otherwise like English h: 
 qu—as qu in quarrel: 
 r—as in corr (trilled): 
 v—like English w.: 
 x—as ks.: 
 ch, ph, th—as c, p, t in can, pan, tan: 
 c—like k always, as in scan, scat:  (not aspirated)
 p—as in span
 t—as in stand

Not all consonants and vowels are pronounced distinctively by all people. The following variant pronunciations are allowed:

 y as  
 ae and oe as 
 h silent
 ch, ph, th as 
 ph as 
 v like English v, 
 w like English v

The stress is based on the classical Latin rule:

 Words with two syllables have the stress on the penult.
 Words with three or more syllables have the stress on the penult only if it is heavy (closed or had a long vowel in Classical Latin), otherwise on the antepenult  (p. xii).
A secondary accent may be placed when necessary as the speaker deems appropriate.

Parts of speech 

Though Peano removed the inflections of Latin from nouns and adjectives, he did not entirely remove grammatical gender, permitting the option of a feminine ending for occupations. The gender of animals is immutable. All forms of nouns end with a vowel and are taken from the ablative case, but as this was not listed in most Latin dictionaries, he gave the rule for its derivation from the genitive case. The plural is not required when not necessary, such as when a number has been specified, the plural can be read from the context, and so on; however Peano gives the option of using the suffix -s to indicate it when needed. Verbs have few inflections of conjugation; tenses and moods are instead indicated by verb adjuncts. The result is a change to a positional language.

Particles 

Particles that have no inflection in classical Latin are used in their natural form:

 Supra, infra, intra, extra... (but superiore, inferiore, interiore, exteriore from superior, -oris and so on.)
 Super, subter, inter, praeter, semper... (but nostro, vestro, dextro... from noster, -tra, -trum and so on.)
 Tres, quatuor, quinque, sex, septem, octo, novem, decem... (but uno from unus, -a, -um; duo from duo, -ae, -o; nullo from nullus, -a, -um; multo from multus, -a, -um, etc.)

Nouns 

The form of nouns depends on the Latin declensions.

Those proper nouns written with the Roman alphabet are kept as close to the original as possible. The following are examples: München, New York, Roma, Giovanni.

Pronouns 

 Personal

 Demonstrative: illo (it, far), isto (it, near), ipso (itself); for conjunction: que (me vide que illo es rapide = I see that it is fast)
 Possessive: meo, tuo, suo, nostro, vestro, (suo)
 Relative and conjunctive: qui (who, that human), quod (which, that thing)
 Reflexive: se
 Indefinitive: un, uno (One tells...), ullo (any), omne or omni (all, each, every), aliquo (anyone), nullo (nothing), nemo (no one)

Verbs 

Verbs are formed from the Latin by dropping the final -re of the infinitive. Tense, mood, etc., are indicated by particles, auxiliary verbs, or adverbs, but none is required if the sense is clear from the context.  If needed, the past may be indicated by preceding the verb with e, and the future with i.

There are specific endings to create the infinitive and participles:

 Basic form: ama (loves)
 Infinitive: amare (to love)
 Passive participle: amato (loved)
 Active participle: amante (loving)

Collateral endings 

 Imperfectum (past): amaba (loved), legeba (read)
 Future: amara (will/shall love), legera (will/shall read)
 Conditional: amare (would love), legere (would read)

The endings -ra and -re are stressed in future and conditional.

Compound tenses 

Composite tenses can be expressed with auxiliary words:

 Praeteritum: habe amato (have loved)
 Future: debe amare / vol amare / habe ad amare (must love / will love / have to love)
 Continuous tenses: me es scribente (I am writing)

Adjectives and adverbs 

Adjectives are formed as follows:

 If the nominative neuter ends with -e, the Latino form is unchanged.
 If the nominative neuter ends with -um, the Latino form is changed to -o: novum > novo (new).
 In all other cases, adjectives are formed with the ablative case from the genitive, as is the case with nouns.

Adjectives can be used as adverbs if the context is clear, or cum mente or in modo can be used:

 Diligente (diligent): Cum mente diligente, cum diligente mente, in modo diligente, in diligente modo = diligently.

Comparative and superlative 

 Positive: illo es tam habile quam te (it is as handy as you)
 Comparative: illo es magis habilis quam te or illo es plus habilis quam te (it is handier than you) and illo es minus habilis quam te (it is less handier than you)
 Superlative: maxim de... and minim de...

Irregularities 

 Bono: meliore: optimo
 Malo: pejore: pessimo
 Magno: majore: maximo
 Parvo: minore: minimo

Articles 

As with Latin, neither the definite nor the indefinite article exists in Latino sine flexione. When necessary they may be translated with pronouns or words such as illo (it, that) or uno (one):

 Da ad me libro = give me (the) book
 Da ad me hoc libro = give me this book
 Da ad me illo libro = give me that book
 Da ad me uno libro = give me a book
 Da ad me illo meo libro = give me that book of mine
 Da ad me uno meo libro = give me a book of mine

Numerals 

 Cardinals: 1 uno, 2 duo, 3 tres, 4 quatuor, 5 quinque 6 sex, 7 septem, 8 octo, 9 novem, 10 decem, 20 viginti, 30 triginta, 40 quadraginta, 50 quinquaginta, 60 sexaginta, 70 septuaginta, 80 octoginta, 90 nonaginta, 100 centum, 1,000 mille, 1,000,000 millione
 Cardinals (cont.): 11 decem-uno, 12 decem-duo, 19 decem-novem, 21 viginti-uno, 101 centum (et) uno, 102 centum (et) duo, 200 duo cento, 300 tres cento
 Ordinals: 1° primo, 2° secundo, 3° tertio, 4° quarto, 5° quinto, 6° sexto, 7° septimo, 8° octavo, 9° nono, 10° decimo, 20° vigesimo, 30° trigesimo, 40° quadragesimo, 50° quinquagesimo, 60° sexagesimo, 70° septuagesimo, 80° octogesimo, 90° nonagesimo, 100° centesimo, 1,000° millesimo, 1,000,000 millionesimo
 Ordinals (cont.): 45° quadragesimo quinto or quadraginta quinto, 58° quinquagesimo octavo or quinquaginta octavo, 345° tres cento quadraginta quinto
 Multiplicatives: uno vice (once), duo vice (twice), tres vice (three times)

Language examples

Criticism 

Peano formally defended the maxim that the best grammar is no grammar, bearing in mind the example of Chinese. (In modern linguistics, counter to popular and Peano's usage, grammar does not refer to morphological structures alone, but also to syntax and phonology, for example, which both Latino sine flexione and Chinese still have. In this sense, "languages without grammar" cannot exist.) According to Lancelot Hogben, Peano's Interlingua still shares a major flaw with many other auxiliary languages, having "either too much grammar of the wrong sort, or not enough of the right".  (p. 10) Hogben argues that at least nouns and verbs should be easily distinguished by characteristic endings, so that one can easily get an initial understanding of the sentence. Thus, in Peano's Interlingua the verbs might be given some specific, standardized verbal form, such as the infinitive, which is sufficient at the Latin indirect speech. Instead, the raw imperative is proposed in De Latino Sine Flexione:

According to Hogben, another handicap is the lack of a pure article, which might clearly indicate the nouns. Nevertheless, Peano occasionally suggested that illo (that) and uno (one) might be used as articles.

Once more according to Hogben, the syntax of Peano's Interlingua remained conservative:

Reviewing the list of more widely known Latin titles, one might conclude that the sequence noun-adjective is the norm in Latin, yet the inverted sequence is also current. The ratio is over 2 to 1 in a list of Latin titles commented by Stroh. E.g. "Principia Mathematica".
As for a sequence nominative-genitive, it may be the norm in Latin in a similar ratio. E.g. "Systema Naturae". Indeed, the sequence nominative-genitive must always be the norm in Peano's Interlingua, since the preposition de must introduce the genitive. Thus, Philosophiæ Naturalis Principia Mathematica would turn into Principio Mathematico de Philosophia Naturale. Since the function of both the adjective and the genitive is often the same, one might infer that the sequence noun-adjective might always be the norm.

See also 

 Interslavic

References

External links 

 Instituto pro Latino sine flexione - Site in Latino sine flexione; Peano's original writings on this language, blog in Latino sine flexione, etc.
 Blog in Latino sine Flexione
 (Latino sine flexione) 100 exemplo de Interlingua, ab Giuseppe Peano
 (Latino sine flexione) Revista "Discussiones", de Academia Pro Interlingua (1909-13)
 Nuntios: Latino sine Flexione in http://nuntios.blogspot.com/

International auxiliary languages
Simplified languages
Constructed languages introduced in the 1900s
1903 introductions
Forms of Latin